Balrothery Tower is a tower house and a National Monument in Balrothery, Ireland.

Location
Balrothery Tower is found in Balrothery, east of the R132.

History
An Anglo-Norman ally of Strongbow, Robert de Rosel, was granted Balrothery in c. 1171 "where he built the town and castle". The name derives from the Irish Baile an Ridire, "the knight's town." His son Patrick became the parson of the church in Balrothery, and after his death Geoffrey de Costedin donated lands at Balrothery to Tristernagh Abbey, Kilbixy between 1191 and 1212.

Building
Balrothery Tower is a three-storey square plan rubble stone crenellated tower house built c. 1500. It has Trefoil headed openings with limestone surround and square headed openings with brick-dressed openings.

In the northwest corner is a turret with spiral stairway.

The top storey of the main tower has a two-light window at each face and the east face has a bell-cote. Lower down in the west wall is a two-light window with ogee heads and a square moulding with one mask.

References

National Monuments in County Dublin
Castles in Fingal
Buildings listed on the Fingal Record of Protected Structures
Tower houses in the Republic of Ireland